Nucleoporin NDC1 is a protein that in humans is encoded by the TMEM48 gene. It anchors aladin to the nuclear pore complex.

References

Further reading

Nuclear pore complex